Yakuza Kiwami 2 is an action-adventure video game developed by Ryu Ga Gotoku Studio and published by Sega. It is a remake of the 2006 video game Yakuza 2 for the PlayStation 2, and is the Yakuza series' second remake title following 2016's Yakuza Kiwami. It was developed using the Dragon game engine from Yakuza 6. The game was released for PlayStation 4 on December 7, 2017 in Japan, and worldwide on August 28, 2018. It was released for Windows worldwide on Steam on May 9, 2019 and released for Xbox One on July 30, 2020. A version for cloud-based platform Amazon Luna was released on January 19, 2023.

Yakuza Kiwami 2 was followed up by the spinoff titles Fist of the North Star: Lost Paradise and Judgment in 2018, and the next mainline installment Yakuza: Like a Dragon in 2020.

Gameplay 
Yakuza Kiwami 2 is a remake of Yakuza 2, and is an action-adventure game set in an open world environment and played from a third-person perspective. Similar to the previous remake title, Yakuza Kiwami, Kiwami 2 follows the same plot structure of Yakuza 2 while adding new gameplay features and enhancements from later titles, as well as new story elements to resolve confusing plot points in the original release and tie the game more closely to other titles in the series. The player controls series protagonist Kazuma Kiryu as they explore the fictional Japanese districts of Kamurocho, Tokyo and Sotenbori, Osaka, based on the real life locations of Kabukicho and Dōtonbori, respectively. Combat is based on that previously seen in Yakuza 6, though with a variety of new moves and special cinematic 'Heat Moves'. A new story scenario, entitled "The Majima Saga" features recurring series anti-hero Goro Majima as a playable character. The Cabaret Club minigame from Yakuza 0 returns, as does the Clan Creator from Yakuza 6, bringing in New Japan Pro-Wrestling stars Keiji Mutoh, Masahiro Chono, Riki Choshu, Genichiro Tenryu, and Tatsumi Fujinami.

Plot

A year after leaving his former life in the Tojo Clan behind, ex-yakuza Kazuma Kiryu is called back into action when the clan's Fifth Chairman, Yukio Terada, is murdered by assassins from a rival organization, the Omi Alliance. Returning to Kamurocho, Kiryu must find a new chairman for the Tojo Clan and prevent an all-out war between the Tojo and the Omi, bringing him into conflict with Ryuji Goda, the legendary "Dragon Of Kansai" of the Omi Alliance.

A new scenario, entitled "The Majima Saga", is centered around Goro Majima and explains how he came to leave the Tojo Clan following the death of his patron, Futoshi Shimano, a year earlier and form a legitimate enterprise, "Majima Construction", between Yakuza and Yakuza 2.

Majima Saga
In February 2006, Tojo Clan's Fifth Chairman Yukio Terada announces a reformation plan for the clan, which requires a replacement for the clan captain position. Up in the run for the position were newcomer Akinobu Uematsu, Kei Ibuchi and Goro Majima, who were making the most profits among the clan. Having no interest in the position and only participating to ensure the other families can band together to keep the newcomers from seizing power, Majima returns to Kamurocho, where he finds himself ambushed by several assassins. After quickly dealing with them, Majima returns to his family office, where he finds his men supposedly beaten up by the Uematsu Family. Majima heads to Uematsu's office, but finds Uematsu himself killed. After reporting the incident to Tojo Clan members, Majima is tipped by Kazama Family patriarch Osamu Kashiwagi to find the Florist of Sai, who can provide him information. Upon meeting with the Florist, he agrees to help Majima in exchange for the latter's agreement in running the Florist's old base in Purgatory. Majima learns that one of his subordinates, Ryota Kawamura, was last seen at the crime scene. He travels to Sotenbori to track down Kawamura, and eventually learns that he's a regular gambler who frequents the massage parlor Hogushi Kaiken. While at the parlor, Majima receives service from Makoto Tateyama, a woman whom Majima saved from the Tojo Clan 18 years prior. Majima, while attempting to hide his identity, learns that Makoto still kept her old watch as a memento of her savior.

Majima later picks up a tip that Kawamura murdered an Omi Alliance officer at the Cabaret Grand. He heads there and confronts Kawamura. The latter is easily defeated, but is then killed by Ibuchi, who exploited Kawamura's debt and used him to get rid of Uematsu, in order to spark a war between the Omi Alliance and the Tojo Clan, which would lead to their eventual merging and Ibuchi seizing power from Terada. Majima defeats Ibuchi, but the latter commits suicide rather than allowing himself to be arrested to incite conflict between both sides. In the aftermath, Majima and Terada come to an agreement to disband his family, as a gesture of apology for Kawamura's action against the Omi Alliance. Majima and the remnants of his family then form Majima Construction, and begin work on the Kamurocho Hills complex. Some time later, Makoto leaves the country with her family; she receives an anonymous gift prior to her departure, which turns out to be a replacement strap for her watch. Realizing that her customer was her savior from 18 years ago, Makoto finds comfort knowing she has no regrets leaving Japan.

Development
Yakuza Kiwami 2 was initially leaked on August 24, 2017 via a listing on the Taiwanese PlayStation Store. The title was officially announced two days later alongside Yakuza: Like a Dragon, Ryu ga Gotoku Online, and Fist of the North Star: Lost Paradise. The game runs on the Dragon Engine which was previously used in Yakuza 6: The Song of Life. Several characters were recast for the remake, including Hakuryu as Ryo Takashima, Houka Kinoshita as Wataru Kurahashi, and Yuichi Kimura as Tsutomo Bessho. The in-game arcade features playable versions of Virtua Fighter 2 and Virtual On: Cyber Troopers.

Music
Japanese rock band SiM provided the theme songs for Kiwami 2. The first song "A" serves as opening theme while the second song "The Sound of Breath" serves as an insert song. Both of these themes are also featured in the ending credits of the game.

Reception

Yakuza Kiwami 2 was well received by critics. It was the best selling game in Japan during its debut week, selling 131,931 units; this was the lowest debut for a Yakuza game, which was noted as expected due to being the first stand-alone PlayStation 4 title that is not a new main entry. The PC version was among the best-selling new releases of the month on Steam.

Famitsu liked the seamless transitions when entering shops or starting battles, and enjoyed being able to use various items in the city as weapons.

The game was nominated for the Freedom Tower Award for Best Remake at the New York Game Awards, and for "Animation, Technical" and "Game, Classic Revival" at the National Academy of Video Game Trade Reviewers Awards.

Notes

References

External links
 

2017 video games
Action-adventure games
Open-world video games
PlayStation 4 games
PlayStation 4 Pro enhanced games
Sega beat 'em ups
Sega video games
Video game remakes
Video games about revenge
Video games set in 2006
Video games set in Osaka
Video games set in Tokyo
Windows games
Xbox Cloud Gaming games
Xbox One games
Xbox One X enhanced games
Yakuza (franchise)
Zainichi Korean culture
Video games developed in Japan